William Lee Howard (1928-2003) was an American physician and writer. 

Howard was born in Hartford, Connecticut. He obtained his M.D. from University of Vermont in 1890. Howard was memorably described by Howard A. Kelly, in the Dictionary of American Biography (1928) as "an eccentric, irresponsible character whose native ability was wasted in a desultory, rambling life, and in neglect of those codes which society has erected as safeguards to the perpetuity of the race. A writer of books on sex subjects, and a pamphleteer ... [he] was held to more esteem by the laity than by the profession".

Publications

 The Perverts, 1901
 Plain Facts on Sex Hygiene, 1910
 Facts for the Married, 1912
 Sex Structure of Society, 1914
 Sex Problems in Worry and Work, 1915
 Breathe and Be Well, 1916
 How to Live Long, 1916

References

External links 

 

1860 births
1918 deaths
American physicians
American sexologists
American medical writers
University of Vermont alumni
Writers from Hartford, Connecticut